Cecilia Gabriela Vera Sandoval ( born January 9, 1962) is a Mexican actress known best for her work in telenovelas. 

She was born in Mexico City.

Filmography

Awards and nominations

Premios TVyNovelas

References

External links 

 Biography of Cecilia Gabriela at the Telenovela Database

Living people
1962 births

Mexican telenovela actresses
Mexican television actresses
Mexican film actresses
Mexican stage actresses
People from Mexico City
Actresses from Mexico City
20th-century Mexican actresses
21st-century Mexican actresses